The 2017–18 Principality Premiership was the second season of the new format of the Principality Premiership, the top tier of club rugby in Wales run by the Welsh Rugby Union. It was contested by sixteen Welsh clubs following an expansion from twelve teams at the start of the 2016–17 season. This season will be "ring-fenced" and relegation will return at the end of the 2018–19 season. The competition was won by Merthyr for the second consecutive year; this season also marked a "double" for Merthyr as they also won the 2017–18 WRU National Cup.

Structure 
The Principality Premiership's structure has altered from the previous season. The teams will be split into two conferences (East and West) for the first half of the season. Each team will play each other team in their conference home and away. After 14 rounds, The league is amalgamated and all points reset to zero. However, clubs are awarded points based on their finishing position in their respective conference e.g. the 1st place team in a conference will receive 8 points, 2nd place – 7 points etc. right down to 8th place – 1 point. Each team will then play the other once, either home or away, for a grand total of 29 games. Unlike previous seasons, the winner will be determined by league position and not a play off system. Therefore, the league leader will be declared champions.  This is the second season in which the "ring-fenced" system will be implemented, meaning no team is in danger of relegation until the 2018–19 season. However, ring-fencing will be under review at the end of this season.

Teams 
The same 16 teams that competed the previous season competed again this season. Merthyr were the reigning champions having beaten Aberavon 22–18 in last year's final.

Standings (East)

Standings (West)

Phase Two 
After 14 rounds, the two conferences merge and points are reset to zero. However, points are awarded to teams prior to this phase according to league position (1st – 8 points, 2nd – 7 points, 3rd – 6 points etc.). Each team now plays each other team once, either home or away, for a grand total of 29 games over the entire season. There is no play-off system this season and the league leader will be crowned 2017–18 Principality Premiership Champions.

Standings (Phase Two)

External links 
 

Welsh Premier Division seasons
2017–18 in Welsh rugby union
Wales